East Bay Red Riders were an American soccer team based in Oakland, California that played in the USISL.

Year-by-year

External links
East Bay Red Riders from The American Soccer Guide (2008) by Kirk J. Lodes

References

Defunct soccer clubs in California
Soccer clubs in Oakland, California
USISL teams
1992 establishments in California
1993 disestablishments in California
Association football clubs established in 1992
Association football clubs disestablished in 1993